Hazara Division is an administrative division of the Khyber Pakhtunkhwa province of Pakistan. It is located along the Indus River and comprises eight districts: Abbottabad, Mansehra, Haripur, Battagram, Upper Kohistan, Kolai-Palas, Lower Kohistan, and Torghar.

In December 2021, the Chief Minister of Khyber Pakhtunkhwa, Mahmood Khan, approved the creation of a new Abaseen Division, which will include five districts of Hazara (Battagram, Torghar, Upper Kohistan, Lower Kohistan, and Kolai-Palas) and one district of Malakand (Shangla).  After the creation of the new Abaseen Division, only the districts of Abbottabad, Haripur, and Mansehra would be part of the Hazara Division.

Location 
Hazara Division is bordered by Malakand and Mardan Divisions to the west, Rawalpindi Division (Punjab) and Islamabad Capital Territory to the south, Azad Kashmir to the east, and Gilgit-Baltistan to the north.

History 
On the dissolution of West Pakistan in 1970, Hazara District and the two tribal agencies were merged to form the new Hazara Division with its capital at Abbottabad. The division was initially composed of two districts (Abbottabad, and Mansehra) but within a few years, Haripur district was spun off from Abbottabad District and Batagram District was spun off from Mansehra District.

Hazara remained a district until its conversion into a division in 1976. In October 1976, Mansehra was given the status of a full-fledged district, which consisted of Mansehra and Batagram tehsils. Subsequently, in July 1991, Haripur Tehsil was separated from Abbottabad and made into a district. Thus only the old Tehsil of Abbottabad remained, which was declared as Abbottabad District.

In 2000, administrative divisions were abolished and the fourth-tier districts were raised to become the new third tier of government in Pakistan. At abolition it contained the 8 districts:

Eventually, with all the administrative divisions being restored back in 2008, Hazara Division has returned.

Demographics 
According to the 2017 census, Hazara Division division had a population of 5,325,121.

Districts 
Hazara Division contains the following districts:
 Abbottabad District
 Batagram District
 Haripur District
 Kolai-Palas District
 Upper Kohistan District (part of Kohistan District until 2014)
 Lower Kohistan District (part of Kohistan District until 2014)
 Mansehra District
 Torghar District (part of Mansehra District until 2011)

See also 
Divisions of Pakistan
 Divisions of Khyber Pakhtunkhwa

References 

Divisions of Khyber Pakhtunkhwa